Kløfta Station was opened at Kløfta in 1854 as a part of Norway's first railway, the Trunk Line between Oslo and Eidsvoll.   

The station was originally called Kløften, but the name was changed to Kløfta in 1920. A new station was built at Kløfta as part of the construction of the Gardermoen Line in 1998.

References

Railway stations on the Trunk Line
Railway stations on the Gardermoen Line
Railway stations in Ullensaker
Railway stations opened in 1854
1854 establishments in Norway